Civilisation—in full, Civilisation: A Personal View by Kenneth Clark—is a 1969 British television documentary series written and presented by the art historian Kenneth Clark.

The thirteen programmes in the series outline the history of Western art, architecture and philosophy since the Dark Ages. The series was produced by the BBC and aired from February to May 1969 on BBC2. Then, and in later transmissions in Britain, the US and other countries it reached an unprecedented number of viewers for an art series. Clark's book of the same title, based on the series, was published in 1969. Its production standards were generally praised and set the pattern for subsequent television documentary series. The New Yorker magazine described it as revelatory for the general viewer.

The BBC's DVD issue in 2005 has remained in the catalogues, and Clark's accompanying 1969 book has never been out of print.

Background 
Clark had pioneered British television series about art, beginning in 1958, with Is Art Necessary?, an experimental series for Associated Television, a commercial broadcaster. Over the next eight years Clark wrote and presented series and one-off programmes on the visual arts, ranging from Caravaggio to Bruegel the Elder, Rembrandt, Goya, Van Gogh and Picasso, and a co-production for commercial television and the BBC, Royal Palaces.

In 1966 David Attenborough, the controller of the BBC's new second television channel, BBC2, was in charge of introducing colour broadcasting to the UK, He conceived the idea of a series about great paintings as the standard-bearer for colour television, and had no doubt that Clark would be much the best presenter for it. Clark was attracted by the suggestion, but at first declined to commit himself. He later recalled that what convinced him that he should take part was Attenborough’s use of the word "civilisation" to sum up what the series would be about.

The series consists of thirteen programmes, each fifty minutes long, written and presented by Clark, covering western European civilisation from the end of the Dark Ages to the early twentieth century. As the civilisation under consideration excludes Graeco-Roman, Asian and other historically important cultures, a title was chosen that disclaimed comprehensiveness: Civilisation: A Personal View by Kenneth Clark. Clark later commented, "I didn't suppose that anyone would be so obtuse as to think that I had forgotten about the great civilisations of the pre-Christian era and the East. However, I confess the title has worried me. It would have been easy in the eighteenth century: Speculations on the Nature of Civilisation as illustrated by the Phases of Civilised Life in Western Europe from the Dark Ages to Present Day. Unfortunately, this is no longer practicable." Although the series focused chiefly on the visual arts and architecture, there were substantial sections about drama, literature, music, philosophy and socio-political movements. Clark wanted to include more about law and philosophy, but "I could not think of any way of making them visually interesting."

After initial mutual antipathy, Clark and his principal director, Michael Gill, established a congenial working relationship. They and their production team spent three years from 1966 filming in a hundred and seventeen locations in thirteen countries. The filming was to the highest technical standards of the day, and quickly went over budget; it cost £500,000 by the time it was complete. Attenborough rejigged his broadcasting schedules to spread the cost, transmitting each episode twice during the thirteen-week run.

Series outline

1. The Skin of Our Teeth

In this first episode Clark—travelling from Byzantine Ravenna to the Celtic Hebrides, from the Norway of the Vikings to Charlemagne's chapel at Aachen—tells the story of the Dark Ages, the six centuries following the collapse of the Roman Empire, and “how European thought and art were saved by 'the skin of our teeth'”.
Sections:
Expressions of an Ideal
The Fall of Rome
Skellig Michael
Iona
The Norsemen
The Baptistry at Poitiers
Charlemagne
The Cross of Lothar.
(US broadcast title: The Frozen World.)

2. The Great Thaw

Clark tells of the sudden reawakening of European civilisation in the 12th century. He traces it from its first manifestations in Cluny Abbey to the Basilica of St Denis and finally to its high point, the building of Chartres Cathedral in the early 13th century.
The Triumph of the Church
the Abbeys of Cluny and Moissac
St Bernard of Clairvaux
St Foy
The Abbey of Vézelay
Gislebertus
The Abbey of St Denis
Abbot Suger
Chartres.

3. Romance and Reality

Beginning at a castle in the Loire and then travelling through the hills of Tuscany and Umbria to the cathedral baptistry at Pisa, Clark examines the aspirations and achievements of the later Middle Ages in 14th century France and Italy.
The Gothic Spirit
Courtly Love
The Siege of the Castle of Love
The Duke of Berry
St Francis of Assisi
Civic Life
Giotto
Dante and Pisano.

4. Man: the Measure of all Things

Visiting Florence, Clark argues that European thought gained a new impetus from its rediscovery of its classical past in the 15th century. He visits the palaces at Urbino and Mantua and other centres of (Renaissance) civilisation.
Early Renaissance
Leonardo Bruni
David (Donatello)
Perspective
Leon Battista Alberti
Jan van Eyck
Botticelli
The Palace of Urbino
The Court of Mantua
A Civilised Countryside.

5. The Hero as Artist

Here Clark takes the viewer back to 16th century Papal Rome—noting the convergence of Christianity and antiquity. He discusses Michelangelo, Raphael, and Leonardo da Vinci;  the courtyards of the Vatican; the rooms decorated for the Pope by Raphael; and the Sistine Chapel.
Giants and Heroes
The Decadence of the Popes
Michelangelo
Bound Captives
The Sistine Chapel
Raphael
Leonardo da Vinci
Man as a Mechanism.

6. Protest and Communication 

Clark discusses the Reformation—the Germany of Albrecht Dürer and Martin Luther and the world of the humanists Erasmus, Montaigne, and Shakespeare.
Riemenschneider
Erasmus
Holbein
Albrecht Dürer
Melancholia
Luther
The Destruction of Images
Michel de Montaigne
William Shakespeare.

7. Grandeur and Obedience

In the Rome of Michelangelo and Bernini, Clark tells of the Catholic Church's fight—the Counter-Reformation—against the Protestant north and the Church's new splendour symbolised by the glory of St Peter's.
The Church of Rome
The Rome of the Popes
St Peter's
The Catholic Church
The Art of Baroque
Bernini
Baldacchino
The Ecstasy of Teresa.

8. The Light of Experience

Clark tells of new worlds in space and in a drop of water—worlds that the telescope and microscope revealed—and the new realism in the Dutch paintings of Rembrandt and other artists that took the observation of human character to a new stage of development in the 17th century.
The Light of Holland
Frans Hals
Rembrandt
Descartes
Vermeer
The Royal Society
Sir Christopher Wren
St Paul's Cathedral.

9. The Pursuit of Happiness 

Clark talks of the harmonious flow and complex symmetries of the works of Bach, Handel, Haydn, and Mozart and the reflection of their music in the architecture of the Rococo churches and palaces of Bavaria.
French Classicism
Johann Sebastian Bach
Balthasar Neumann
Handel
Watteau
Haydn
Rococo Buildings
Wolfgang Amadeus Mozart.

10. The Smile of Reason 

Clark discusses the Age of Enlightenment,  tracing it from the polite conversations of the elegant Parisian salons of the 18th century to subsequent revolutionary politics, the great European palaces of Blenheim and Versailles, and finally Thomas Jefferson's Monticello.
The Enlightenment
England
The Parisian Salon
Chardin
Scotland
Voltaire
Thomas Jefferson
George Washington.

11. The Worship of Nature 

Belief in the divinity of nature, Clark argues, usurped Christianity's position as the chief creative force in Western civilisation and ushered in the Romantic movement. Clark visits Tintern Abbey and the Alps and discusses the landscape paintings of Turner and Constable.
The Ruins of Religion
Rousseau
The Cult of Sensibility
Wordsworth
Constable
Turner
The Sky
Impressionism.

12. The Fallacies of Hope 

Clark argues that the French Revolution led to the dictatorship of Napoleon and the dreary bureaucracies of the 19th century, and he traces the disillusionment of the artists of Romanticism—from Beethoven's music to Byron's poetry, Delacroix's paintings, and Rodin's sculpture.
An Escape from Reason
The French Revolution
Napoleon Bonaparte
Beethoven
Byron
Turner and Gericault
Delacroix
Rodin.

13. Heroic Materialism 

Clark concludes the series with a discussion of the materialism and humanitarianism of the 19th and 20th centuries. He visits the industrial landscape of 19th century England and the skyscrapers of 20th century New York City. He argues that the achievements of the engineers and scientists—such as Brunel and Rutherford—have been matched by those of the great reformers like Wilberforce and Shaftesbury.
The Abolition of Slavery
The Industrial Revolution
Humanitarianism
Isambard Kingdom Brunel
Courbet and Millet
Tolstoy
Our Urge to Destruction
God-given Genius.

The series was co-produced by Gill and Peter Montagnon; the cinematographer was Kenneth McMillan; original music was composed by Edwin Astley. Gill directed episodes 1, 3, 5, 8, 10, 12 and 13. Montagnon directed episodes 2, 6, 7, 9, and co-directed episode 11 with Ann Turner, who also directed episode 4.

The series was replayed on BBC Four and released in the Region 2 DVD area in 2005; a Region 1 set followed in 2006. The DVD release included a short interview with David Attenborough about the commissioning and production of the series.

Reception
Civilisation attracted unprecedented viewing figures for a high art series: 2.5 million viewers in Britain and 5 million in the US. Clark's accompanying book has never been out of print, and the BBC issued the series on DVDs which continued to sell thousands of copies every year. In 2016, The New Yorker echoed the words of John Betjeman, describing Clark as "the man who made the best telly you’ve ever seen".  The magazine's reviewer continued, "Scholars and academics had their understandable quibbles, but for the general public the series was something like a revelation. Art-museum exhibits in both England and the U.S. reported a surge of visitors following each episode."

There have been complaints in recent times that by focusing on a traditional choice of the great artists over the centuries – all men – Clark had neglected women, and presented "a saga of noble names and sublime objects with little regard for the shaping forces of economics or practical politics". His modus operandi was dubbed "the great man approach", and he described himself on screen as a hero-worshipper and a stick-in-the-mud. He commented that his outlook was "nothing striking, nothing original, nothing that could not have been written by an ordinary harmless bourgeois of the later nineteenth century":

The broadcaster Huw Weldon believed that Civilisation was "a truly great series, a major work ... the first magnum opus attempted and realised in terms of TV." There was a widespread view among critics, including some unsympathetic to Clark's selections, that the filming set new standards. The series was described as "visually stunning" by critics on both sides of the Atlantic, including Paul B. Harvey in the US and Mary Beard in Britain. In 2011 Jonathan Jones wrote in The Guardian of Civilisation's "sheer visual beauty ... the camerawork and direction ... rise to the poetry of cinema".

The British Film Institute notes how Civilisation changed the shape of cultural television, setting the standard for later documentary series, from Alastair Cooke's America (1972) and Jacob Bronowski's The Ascent of Man (1973) to the present day.

Sequel
The BBC announced in 2015 that it was to make a ten-episode sequel to Clark’s series, to be called Civilisations (plural), with three presenters, Mary Beard, David Olusoga and Simon Schama. A co-production with PBS in the United States, it would not cover western European civilisation in the same detail, but would additionally cover Graeco-Roman and non-European cultures. The series, reduced from the planned ten to nine episodes, was trailed in February 2018, with transmission starting on 1 March in the UK and 17 April in the US on PBS.

See also
 Ways of Seeing, 1972 series
 The Ascent of Man, 1973 series
 The Shock of the New, 1980 series

References

Sources

External links 

 British Film Institute Screen Online
 

1969 British television series debuts
1969 British television series endings
1960s British documentary television series
Civilizations
Historical television series
British documentary television series
Documentary television series about art
Peabody Award-winning television programs
BBC television documentaries about medieval history
BBC television documentaries about history during the 16th and 17th centuries
BBC television documentaries about history during the 18th and 19th centuries
BBC television documentaries about history during the 20th Century